Arthur Cleghorn (1 December 1873  – 27 May 1951) was an Australian rules footballer who played for the Essendon Football Club in the Victorian Football League (VFL).

Family
The son of the tailor and outfitter James Cleghorn (1826-1886), and Ann McPherson Cleghorn, née McGregor (1847-1928), Arthur Cleghorn was born at Richmond, Victoria on 1 December 1873.

Football

Essendon (VFL)
Playing as a rover, and making his debut, he was one of the 20 who played for Essendon in its first VFL match against Geelong, at Corio Oval, on 8 May 1897:  Jim Anderson, Edward "Son" Barry, Arthur Cleghorn, Tod Collins, Jim Darcy, Charlie Forbes, Johnny Graham, Joe Groves, George Hastings, Ted Kinnear, George Martin, Bob McCormick, Pat O'Loughlin, Gus Officer, Ned Officer, Bert Salkeld, George Stuckey, George Vautin, Norman Waugh, and Harry Wright.

In the first year of the VFL competition, 1897, he became one of the club's and the VFL's first premiership players. 

He topped the club's goalkicking tally in 1899 and, on 26 August 1899 kicked 5 goals against St Kilda.

Richmond (VFA)
He was cleared from Essendon to Richmond in June 1904.

Playing on the half-forward flank, he was a member of Richmond's 1905 Victorian Football Association (VFA) premiership team.

Death
He died on 27 May 1951, at the Alfred Hospital, Prahran, Victoria, three weeks after he was struck by a car, near his home in Moorabbin, on 5 May 1951.

Notes

References
 Holmesby, Russell & Main, Jim (2014), The Encyclopedia of AFL Footballers: every AFL/VFL player since 1897 (10th ed.), Melbourne, Victoria: Bas Publishing. 
 Hogan P: The Tigers Of Old, Richmond FC, (Melbourne), 1996. 
 Maplestone, M., Flying Higher: History of the Essendon Football Club 1872–1996, Essendon Football Club, (Melbourne), 1996.

External links

Cleghorn, Arthur; Past Player Profiles, Essendon Football Club
 
 
 Arthur Cleghorn, at The VFA Project.

1873 births
1951 deaths
Australian rules footballers from Melbourne
Australian Rules footballers: place kick exponents
Essendon Football Club players
Essendon Football Club Premiership players
Richmond Football Club (VFA) players
One-time VFL/AFL Premiership players
People from Richmond, Victoria